Trader Jon's was a bar in Pensacola, Florida which operated from 1953 to 2003. It became famous for its owner, Martin "Trader Jon" Weissman's personal eccentricities, "Tradernomics", and large collection of military memorabilia.

History 
The building that was the location of Trader Jon's was erected in 1896. From the 1890s to the 1950s, it was home to Samuel Charles Shoe and Leather Establishment and Birgar Testman's ship chandlery, as well as being rented out to numerous other businesses.

On January 1, 1953, Martin Weissman founded Trader Jon's with his wife, Jackie Bond. Before opening the bar, Weissman served in the United States Army, training as a paratrooper during World War II, but being discharged after breaking his ankle before his scheduled deployment to Europe. He later operated bars in Miami and Key West before moving to Pensacola. 

The bar became famous for its owner, Martin "Trader Jon" Weissman's mismatched socks, personal eccentricities, and practice which became known as "Tradernomics", in which he would give drinks based on his mood and how well he knew the customer. Many celebrities, including John Wayne, Larry King and Prince Andrew, visited the bar.

In September 1997, Weissman suffered a stroke that left him partly paralyzed and with impaired speech. Having never fully recovered, he died at the age of 84 on February 18, 2000. On January 16, 2001, six people were in the bar when customers noticed smoke coming from the Blue Angels Museum room in the bar. Two customers raced over to save as much things as possible from the fire, and the Pensacola Fire Department stopped the fire before it could spread to the rest of the bar. Trader Jon's officially closed on November 9, 2003.

In October 2016, a new exhibit in the Pensacola Museum of History opened, featuring 15 percent of the estimated 10,000 pieces of military memorabilia that make up the Trader Jon collection, which is valued at $2,000,000.

Notable visitors 

Brooke Shields, American actress and model
Daniel James Jr., first African American United States four-star general
Don Sutton, American baseball player
Elizabeth Taylor, British-American actress
Ernest Borgnine, American actor
George Wallace, 45th governor of Alabama
Henry Fonda, American actor
Joe Scarborough, American cable news and talk radio host, lawyer, author, and former politician
John Glenn, American astronaut and politician
John McCain, American politician and United States Navy officer
John Wayne, American actor
Larry King, American television and radio host
Neil Armstrong, American astronaut and aeronautical engineer, first person to walk on the Moon
Prince Andrew, Duke of York
Richard Marcinko, United States Navy officer
Roy Jones Jr., American former professional boxer

In popular culture 

 The fictional "TJ's Restaurant" in the 1982 romantic drama film An Officer and a Gentleman is an homeage to Trader Jon's.

See also 
List of defunct restaurants of the United States
Timeline of Pensacola, Florida

References 

Bars (establishments)
Restaurants in Florida
Defunct restaurants in the United States
Defunct restaurants in Florida
Buildings and structures in Pensacola, Florida
Pensacola, Florida